Kungu "Christine" Bakombo (born 7 August 1962) is a Congolese long-distance runner. She competed in the women's marathon at the 1992 Summer Olympics.

References

External links
 

1962 births
Living people
Democratic Republic of the Congo female long-distance runners
Democratic Republic of the Congo female marathon runners
Olympic female marathon runners
Olympic athletes of the Democratic Republic of the Congo
Athletes (track and field) at the 1984 Summer Olympics
Athletes (track and field) at the 1988 Summer Olympics
Athletes (track and field) at the 1992 Summer Olympics
World Athletics Championships athletes for the Democratic Republic of the Congo
Place of birth missing (living people)
21st-century Democratic Republic of the Congo people